Carlos Díaz "Caíto" (1945–2004) was an Argentine singer-songwriter and guitarist who lived in Mexico for most of his career.

Biography 
He was born in 1945 in Mar de Plata, in the Buenos Aires Province and started creating music from the age of eight. At age 15, he entered the Conservatory and started making professional recordings. After touring South America and Europe, he arrived in Mexico in 1977 along with the Uruguayan singer-songwriter Alfredo Zitarrosa. He decided to settle in Mexico City and joined the group Sanampay, which was made up of both Mexican and exiled Argentinian musicians, recording three albums with the group.

In 1981, he resumed his solo career, singing songs by Zitarossa, Luis Eduardo Aute and Pablo Milanés in addition to his own compositions.

He died in Mexico City on 8 November 2004, age 59, after a short battle with lung cancer. He was survived by his long-time partner and their daughter.

Discography
 Caito en Bossa, Argentina 1972
 Caito en Guitarra y Canciones, Argentina 1972
 Caito en Bossa y Algo Mas, Argentina 1974
 Guitarra Negra, México 1977 (with Alfredo Zitarrosa)
 Yo Te Nombro, México 1978 (with Sanampay)
 Coral Terrestre, México 1980 (with Sanampay)
 A Pesar de Todo, México 1981 (with Sanampay)
 De Alguna Manera- Caito, México 1982
 Dentro – Caito, México 1984
 Guadalupe Pineda y Caito, México 1985
 Carlos Diaz "Caito" – Vol. 1, México 1986
 Amigos Mios- Caito y Transito, México 1988
 Personal – Caito, México 1989
 Canciones de Amor y Rosas, México 1993
 En Concierto- Caito, México 1995
 Tangos – Caito, México 1996
 Las Malas Compañias, México 1997
 Simplemente, México 1998
 Caito Canta a Zitarrosa, México 1998
 Ay Amor, México 1998 (with Adriana Landeros)
 Amada, México 2001
 Humor en Serio, México 2001
 Guitarra Amada, México 2002
 Sólo Para Amorosos, México 2002
 Pasaba Por Aquí, México 2003
 Y el Amor..., México 2004
 El Aute de Amar, México 2004 (with Adriana Landeros and Luis Eduardo Aute)
 Méexicano, México 2005
 Encuentro Norte-Sur (with Armando Arenas and Jacqueline Levot), 2006

References 

Argentine male guitarists
1945 births
2004 deaths
20th-century Argentine  male singers
20th-century guitarists
Argentine male singer-songwriters